Uguccione della Faggiuola (c. 1250 – 1 November 1319) was an Italian condottiero, and Ghibelline magistrate of Pisa, Lucca and Forlì (from 1297).

Biography

Uguccione was born at Casteldelci and came to prominence in the late 13th century as captain for the Aretine army, when he successfully captured Cesena. In 1297, he attempted to conquer Forlì but was unsuccessful.

Of Ghibelline association, in 1311–1312 Uguccione was imperial vicar in Genoa for Henry VII, who came to Pisa in 1312. After the latter's death in 1313, Uguccione was made chief magistrate (podestà), captain of the people, and virtual lord of Pisa. From 1314 to 1316, Pisa became the center of Ghibelline activity under Uguccione's rule.

Uguccione sacked Lucca in 1314 with the help of his protégé Castruccio Castracani. On 29 August 1315 he delivered the Guelphs of Florence and their Angevin associates from Naples their worst defeat since 1260 in the battle of Montecatini in the Val di Nievole.

In 1316 risings in Pisa and Lucca drove Uguccione out and he took refuge under Cangrande della Scala, who made Uguccione podestà of Vicenza.

Uguccione died of malaria during the siege of Padua on 1 November 1319.

Notes

References

Sources

1250 births
1319 deaths
14th-century condottieri
Politicians from Genoa
13th-century condottieri